Janet Peoples is an American screenwriter. She co-wrote the script for the 1995 Academy Award-nominated film 12 Monkeys with her husband David Peoples who has written a number of films, mostly science fiction or fantasy. She and her husband also co-wrote the 1980 documentary The Day After Trinity, which was also nominated for an Academy Award.

External links 
 

Year of birth missing (living people)
Living people
American screenwriters
American film producers
American women screenwriters
21st-century American women